"Daughter from California" syndrome is a phrase used in the medical profession to describe a situation in which a hitherto disengaged relative challenges the care a dying elderly patient is being given, or insists that the medical team pursue aggressive measures to prolong the patient's life. In his 2015 book The Conversation: A Revolutionary Plan for End-of-Life Care, American doctor Angelo Volandes ascribes this to "guilt and denial", "not necessarily what is best for the patient".

The "daughter from California" is often described as angry, articulate, and informed.

Medical professionals say that because the "daughter from California" has been absent from the life and care of the elderly patient, they are frequently surprised by the scale of the patient's deterioration, and may have unrealistic expectations about what is medically feasible. They may feel guilty about having been absent, and may therefore feel motivated to reassert their role as an involved caregiver.

The phrase was first documented by a collective of gerontologists in a 1991 case report published in the Journal of the American Geriatrics Society, titled "Decision Making in the Incompetent Elderly: 'The Daughter from California Syndrome. In the paper, Molloy and colleagues presented strategies intended to help medical staff deal with the difficult family members of mentally incompetent patients.

In California, the "daughter from California" is known as the "daughter from New York"; the "daughter from Ontario" is a Canadian variant.

References

Culture-bound syndromes
Medical slang
Palliative care
Cultural history of California